The 2007 Telus Cup was Canada's 29th annual national midget 'AAA' hockey championship, played April 23–29, 2007 at Red Deer, Alberta.  The Prince Albert Mintos went undefeated throughout the Telus Cup national tournament for the second consecutive year to defend their title, defeating the host Red Deer Optimist Rebels 3-2 in the gold medal game.

Teams

Round robin

Standings

Scores

Prince Albert 2 - Vancouver 1
Saint-François 3 - St. John's 1
Red Deer 2 - Sault Ste. Marie 0
Vancouver 2 - Sault Ste. Marie 1
Red Deer 10 - St. John's 0
Prince Albert 3 - Saint-François 1
Prince Albert 3 - St. John's 2
Red Deer 5 - Vancouver 0
Saint-François 7 - Sault Ste. Marie 0
Vancouver 4 - Saint-François 1
Prince Albert 2 - Red Deer 0
St. John's 4 - Sault Ste. Marie 1
Prince Albert 4 - Sault Ste. Marie 1
Vancouver 4 - St. John's 2
Red Deer 6 - Saint-François 2

Playoffs

Semi-finals
Prince Albert 4 - Saint-François 2
Red Deer 3 - Vancouver 2

Bronze-medal game
Saint-François 3 - Vancouver 1

Gold-medal game
Prince Albert 3 - Red Deer 2 (2OT)

Individual awards
Most Valuable Player: Marc Boulanger (Red Deer)
Top Scorer: Kyle Reynolds (Red Deer)
Top Forward: Tyler Fiddler (Prince Albert)
Top Defenceman: Lewis Laczko (Prince Albert)
Top Goaltender: Carsen Chubak (Prince Albert)
Most Sportsmanlike Player: Matthew Bell (Vancouver)

See also
Telus Cup

External links
2007 Telus Cup Home Page
Hockey Canada-Telus Cup Guide and Record Book

Telus Cup
Telus Cup
Sports competitions in Red Deer, Alberta
April 2007 sports events in Canada
Ice hockey competitions in Alberta
2007 in Alberta